Libya competed at the 2010 Summer Youth Olympics, the inaugural Youth Olympic Games, held in Singapore from 14 August to 26 August 2010.

Medalists

Athletics

Girls
Track and Road Events

Equestrian

Judo

Individual

Team

Shooting

Rifle

Swimming

Taekwondo

Weightlifting

References

External links
Competitors List: Libya – Singapore 2010 official site

Nations at the 2010 Summer Youth Olympics
2010
Youth Olympics